Devinder Kumar Sehrawat is an Indian politician and former member of the Sixth Legislative Assembly of Delhi of  India. He has represented the Bijwasan constituency of New Delhi(being a member of The AAM AADMI PARTY before defecting to BJP political party. He was disqualified by Speaker from membership of Delhi Vidhansabha under Anti-Defection Law.

Early life and education
Devinder Kumar Sehrawat was born in Delhi. His father's name is Ram Prakash Sehrawat. He attended the University of Madras and Jawaharlal Nehru University and attained Master of Science and Bachelor of Science degrees. Sehrawat served in the Indian Army and retired from the rank of colonel.

Political career
Devinder Kumar Sehrawat has been a MLA for one term. He represented the Bijwasan constituency and was a member of the Aam Aadmi Party political party. He was disqualified under Dal-Badal Adhiniyam

Posts held

See also
 Aam Aadmi Party
 Bijwasan
 Delhi Legislative Assembly
 Government of India
 Legislative Assembly of Delhi
 Politics of India
 Sixth Legislative Assembly of Delhi

References 

1965 births
Aam Aadmi Party politicians from Delhi
Delhi MLAs 2015–2020
Living people
People from New Delhi
Indian Army personnel
Bharatiya Janata Party politicians from Delhi
Bharatiya Janata Party politicians from Haryana